Shesher Golpo  is an Indian Bengali romantic drama film directed by Jiit Chakraborty. The film stars Soumitra Chatterjee as 'Amit Ray' and Mamata Shankar as 'Labanya', in the lead roles. The music of Shesher Golpo is composed by Joy Sarkar. The film is an extension of Shesher Kabita, the famous 1929 novel by Rabindranath Tagore.

Plot 
The film is an imaginary dialogue between elderly Amit Ray and Labanya of the novel Shesher Kabita by Rabindranath Tagore. Many years after the separation, 'Amit Ray' (Soumitra Chatterjee) now runs an old age home near Kolkata with his friend Narendra. One fine morning Labanya Dutta (Mamata Shankar), a retired professor of the Oxford University reached there and the long lost chapter of love reviewed with a parallel storyline of a young couple, Akash & Kuhu.

Cast
 Soumitra Chatterjee as Amit Ray
 Mamata Shankar as Labanya
 Kharaj Mukherjee as Nabakrishna 
 Durga Santra as Kuhu
 Arna Mukhopadhatay as Akash
 Krishna Kishor Mukhopadhay as Narendra
 Pallavi Chatterjee as Amit's sister Shomita (“CiCi”)
 Kalyan Chottopadhay as Indra Chandra
 Pradip Chakraborty as Mr. Sen
 Pradip Bhattacharya as Batuk
 Reshi Bhattacharya as Jogomaya
 Pradip Chakraborty as Mr. Sen

Release 
It was theatrically released on 19 July 2019.

Soundtrack

The soundtrack is composed by Joy Sarkar on lyrics by Rajib Chakraborty

References

External links 

 
 
Official website
Bengali-language Indian films
2010s Bengali-language films
2019 romantic drama films
Indian romantic drama films
Memorials to Rabindranath Tagore
Films set in West Bengal
2019 films